Khashoggi is an Arabic surname of Turkish origin (from , "spoonmaker"). Notable people with the surname include:

 Adnan Khashoggi (1935–2017), Saudi businessman, son of Muhammad Khashoggi
 Emad Khashoggi (born 1968), Saudi businessman, son of Adil Khashoggi and grandson of Muhammad Khashoggi
 Jamal Khashoggi (1958–2018), murdered Saudi journalist and dissident, son of Ahmad Khashoggi and grandson of Muhammad Khashoggi
 Muhammad Khashoggi (1889–1978), Saudi medical doctor, personal doctor of founder of Saudi Arabia King Abdulaziz Al Saud
 Nabila Khashoggi (born 1962), American businesswoman, actress, and philanthropist, daughter of Adnan Khashoggi
 Samira Khashoggi (1935–1986), Saudi novelist, daughter of Muhammad Khashoggi, and mother of Dodi Fayed
 Soheir Khashoggi (born 1947), Saudi novelist, daughter of Muhammad Khashoggi

Surnames of Turkish origin